Paynes Town is a settlement in Jamaica.

References  Public Housing Supporting kids 
Housing development from studios to 5 bedroom houses  involving high rise flats and million Jamaican Dollars housing start of new housing project eco team project   

Populated places in Jamaica